Grammicosum flavofasciatum is a species of beetle in the family Cerambycidae, the only species in the genus Grammicosum.

References

Hesperophanini